John Gerard Flood (born 25 December 1960) is a Scottish former professional footballer who played as a striker.

Career
Born in Glasgow, Flood played for Sheffield United, Airdrieonians, Partick Thistle and Kirkintilloch Rob Roy.

References

1960 births
Living people
Scottish footballers
Sheffield United F.C. players
Airdrieonians F.C. (1878) players
Partick Thistle F.C. players
Kirkintilloch Rob Roy F.C. players
English Football League players
Scottish Football League players
Footballers from Glasgow
Association football forwards